= Kesarkoppa =

Coordinates: 13°42′N 75°41′E

- Village
- Interactive map of Kesarkoppa
- Country: India
- State: Karnataka
- District: Belgaum

Languages
  - Official: Kannada
- Time zone: UTC+5:30 (IST)

Kesarkoppa is a village in Belgaum district in Karnataka, India.
